The Skinner Baronetcy, of Pont Street in the Borough of Chelsea, is a title in the Baronetage of the United Kingdom. It was created on 9 February 1912 for Thomas Skinner. He was the founder of Thomas Skinner & Co, publishers, and a Director of the Canadian Pacific Railway, of the Hudson's Bay Company and of the Bank of Montreal. The second Baronet was President of Thomas Skinner & Co.

Skinner baronets, of Pont Street (1912)
Sir Thomas Skinner, 1st Baronet (1840–1926)
Sir (Thomas) Hewitt Skinner, 2nd Baronet (1875–1968)
Sir (Thomas) Gordon Skinner, 3rd Baronet (1899–1972)
Sir (Thomas) Keith Hewitt Skinner, 4th Baronet (1927–2021)
Sir (Thomas) James Hewitt Skinner, 5th Baronet (born 1962)

The heir presumptive is the current holder's brother, Ian Ivor Hewitt Skinner (born 1964).

Notes

Son of Thomas James Hewitt Skinner is Thomas Alexander Keith Skinner born 24 September 2007

References
Kidd, Charles, Williamson, David (editors). Debrett's Peerage and Baronetage (1990 edition). New York: St Martin's Press, 1990, 

Skinner